Livermore Falls is a town in Androscoggin County, Maine, United States.  The population was 3,060 at the 2020 census. It is included in both the Lewiston-Auburn, Maine Metropolitan Statistical Area and the Lewiston-Auburn, Maine Metropolitan New England City and Town Area. High school students in Livermore Falls attend Spruce Mountain High School.

History

The area was once part of the Abenaki Indian territory called Rockemeka, meaning "great corn place." It would be granted by the General Court of Massachusetts in 1771 as Port Royal, awarded to heirs of veterans who served in the campaign against the Acadian capital of Port Royal in 1710. It was settled in 1786, then incorporated in 1795 as Livermore after Deacon Elijah Livermore, one of the first English settlers. The county line, determined by the Androscoggin River, divided the town. West of the river was Oxford County, and east was Kennebec County. Consequently, East Livermore  (which encompassed a quarter of the original Port Royal grant) was set off and incorporated on March 1, 1844. It became part of Androscoggin County on March 31, 1854. On March 15, 1929, East Livermore was renamed Livermore Falls.

In the early 19th century, the region was predominantly farmland, with apple orchards and dairies supplying markets at Boston and Portland. It was noted for fine cattle. As the century progressed, gristmills, sawmills, logging and lumber became important industries, operated by water power from falls that drop 14 feet. With the arrival of the Androscoggin Railroad in 1852, Livermore Falls developed as a small mill town. Shoe factories and paper mills were established, including the Umbagog Pulp Company started by Hugh J. Chisholm. In 1897, the Third Bridge was built across the Androscoggin. It measured 800 feet in length, at that time the longest single-span bridge in New England.

Geography

Livermore Falls is drained by the Androscoggin River.

Climate

This climatic region is typified by large seasonal temperature differences, with warm to hot (and often humid) summers and cold (sometimes severely cold) winters.  According to the Köppen Climate Classification system, Livermore Falls has a humid continental climate, abbreviated "Dfb" on climate maps.

Demographics

2010 census

As of the census of 2010, there were 3,187 people, 1,316 households, and 809 families living in the town. The racial makeup of the town was 96.1% White, 0.3% African American, 0.3% Native American, 0.3% Asian, 0.9% from other races, and 2.1% from two or more races. Hispanic or Latino of any race were 2.2% of the population.

There were 1,316 households, of which 33.9% had children under the age of 18 living with them, 40.8% were married couples living together, 14.3% had a female householder with no husband present, 6.4% had a male householder with no wife present, and 38.5% were non-families. 31.1% of all households were made up of individuals, and 12.7% had someone living alone who was 65 years of age or older. The average household size was 2.41 and the average family size was 2.95.

The median age in the town was 38.1 years. 25.8% of residents were under the age of 18; 7.8% were between the ages of 18 and 24; 25.6% were from 25 to 44; 25.6% were from 45 to 64; and 15.2% were 65 years of age or older. The gender makeup of the town was 49.2% male and 50.8% female.

2000 census

As of the census of 2000, there were 3,227 people, 1,322 households, and 835 families living in the town. The racial makeup of the town was 97.27% White, 0.50% Black or African American, 0.62% Native American, 0.22% Asian, 0.03% from other races, and 1.36% from two or more races. Hispanic or Latino of any race were 1.02% of the population.

There were 1,322 households, out of which 33.0% had children under the age of 18 living with them, 44.8% were married couples living together, 13.2% had a female householder with no husband present, and 36.8% were non-families. 30.8% of all households were made up of individuals, and 12.9% had someone living alone who was 65 years of age or older.  The average household size was 2.39 and the average family size was 2.95.

In the town, the population was spread out, with 27.8% under the age of 18, 7.6% from 18 to 24, 27.4% from 25 to 44, 21.8% from 45 to 64, and 15.3% who were 65 years of age or older.  The median age was 36 years. For every 100 females, there were 96.1 males.  For every 100 females age 18 and over, there were 90.4 males.

The median income for a household in the town was $30,102, and the median income for a family was $33,354. Males had a median income of $30,139 versus $22,381 for females. The per capita income for the town was $15,935.  About 13.2% of families and 15.7% of the population were below the poverty line, including 17.7% of those under age 18 and 13.2% of those age 65 or over.

Voter registration

Transportation

The Bowman Field airport is located four nautical miles (5 mi, 7 km) southeast of the central business district of Livermore Falls.

Education

Livermore Falls is part of Maine School Administrative District #36. MSAD 36 was renamed RSU 36 in 2009. The three schools in the district are Livermore Elementary School, Livermore Falls Middle School and Livermore Falls High School.

In 2010 RSU 36 consolidated with Jay Schools to form RSU 73 encompassing Jay, Livermore and Livermore Falls. Jay High School and Livermore Falls High School were renamed Spruce Mountain High School North and South campuses respectively. The Tigers and Andies mascots were replaced by the Spruce Mountain Phoenix. Livermore Falls Middle School was closed in the summer of 2011 and the students and faculty were incorporated into the new Spruce Mountain Middle School located at the former Jay Middle School building. Plans to unite the two high schools under one roof are being laid with a number of options available, a) Extend the current North Campus facility to accommodate the students and staff from the South Campus, b) Install portable buildings to increase the space at North Campus to facilitate the union of the high schools, c) relocate the Spruce Mountain Middle School to the South Campus and move the South Campus High School to the North Campus. The vote to allow the raising of a bond to enable the building of the planned extension failed in early 2012 and the other options are being examined.

Notable people 

 Kevin Bailey, Texas politician
 Louise Bogan, poet, critic
 Herbert Elijah Wadsworth, businessman

References

External links
 Town of Livermore Falls, Maine
 Treat Memorial Library
Maine Genealogy: Livermore Falls, Androscoggin County, Maine

Towns in Androscoggin County, Maine
Towns in Maine
1786 establishments in Massachusetts
Populated places established in 1786